Accidental may refer to:

 Accidental (music), a symbol which changes the pitch of a note
 Accidental (album), by Fred Frith
 Accidental (biology), a biological phenomenon more commonly known as vagrancy
 The Accidental, a 2005 novel by Ali Smith
 The Accidental (band), a UK folk band
 Accidental property, a philosophical term

See also
 Accidence (or inflection), a modification of a word to express different grammatical categories
 Accident (disambiguation)
 Adventitious, which is closely related to "accidental" as used in philosophy and in biology
 Random, which often is used incorrectly where accidental or adventitious would be appropriate